Dillon Anthony Day (born October 17, 1991) is a former American football center. He played college football for Mississippi State, where he was the starting center for four years: 2011, 2012, 2013, and 2014.

Professional career

Denver Broncos
After going undrafted in the 2015 NFL Draft, Day signed with the Denver Broncos where he spent the whole season on the team's practice squad. On February 7, 2016, Day was part of the Broncos team that won Super Bowl 50 over the Carolina Panthers by a score of 24–10.

On September 3, 2016, Day was waived by the Broncos, and was signed to the practice squad the next day. Day spent the entire season once again on the practice squad and signed a reserve/future contract with the Broncos on January 2, 2017.

On September 2, 2017, Day was waived by the Broncos and was signed to the practice squad the next day. After spending over two straight seasons on the Broncos' practice squad, Day was promoted to the active roster on October 21, 2017. He was waived by the Broncos on October 24, 2017.

Indianapolis Colts
On October 25, 2017, Day was claimed off waivers by the Indianapolis Colts. He was waived by the Colts on November 6, 2017.

Denver Broncos (second stint)
On November 8, 2017, Day was signed to the Broncos' practice squad.

Green Bay Packers
On December 20, 2017, Day was signed by the Green Bay Packers off the Broncos' practice squad.

On September 1, 2018, Day was waived by the Packers.

San Francisco 49ers
On July 26, 2019, Day signed a one-year contract with the San Francisco 49ers. He was released on August 27, 2019.

Seattle Dragons
In October 2019, Day was drafted by the Seattle Dragons in the 2020 XFL Draft. He had his contract terminated when the league suspended operations on April 10, 2020.

References

External links
Mississippi State Bulldogs bio
Denver Broncos bio

1991 births
Living people
American football centers
Denver Broncos players
Green Bay Packers players
Indianapolis Colts players
Mississippi State Bulldogs football players
People from West Monroe, Louisiana
Players of American football from Louisiana
San Francisco 49ers players
Seattle Dragons players